The Honda Shadow Sabre (VT1100C2) refers to a cruiser-type motorcycle, that is part of the larger family of Honda Shadow. It was introduced in 2000 replacing the earlier Shadow A.C.E. It was retired after the year 2007. The Sabre name is being used again in the new 2010 Honda VT1300C custom line.

The Shadow Sabre was, at its introduction, the hot rod (or in motorcycle jargon, the street rod) of Honda's cruiser line. As such, it has lower gearing than other 1100cc Shadows, for a stronger punch off the line, while retaining exactly the same (dual pin crank) engine as the others. The Sabre, as with the other Shadow 1100 models, were made at Honda's Marysville Motorcycle Plant in Ohio, for the domestic and export markets.

References

Shadow Sabre
Cruiser motorcycles
Motorcycles introduced in 2000